Elston Grove Historic District is a national historic district located at Michigan City, LaPorte County, Indiana.  The district encompasses 215 contributing buildings and 1 contributing structure in a predominantly residential section of Michigan City. It developed between about 1860 and 1963, and includes examples of Italianate, Greek Revival, Queen Anne, Colonial Revival, and Bungalow / American Craftsman style architecture.  Notable buildings include the A.J. Henry House (1904, 1908), Kubik Doctors Office (1953), Manny House (1902), Haskell-Boyd House (1875, c. 1917), Moritz House (1911), Zorn Brewey (c. 1877), Petti Grocery (c. 1900), Luchtman Building (c. 1900), Dr. Ginther House (1940), Sherman Apartment Building (1921), First Baptist Church (1914), the Public Library (1896-1897), and the Adventist Church - Christian Science Church (c. 1860).

It was listed in the National Register of Historic Places in 2013.

References

Michigan City, Indiana
Historic districts on the National Register of Historic Places in Indiana
Houses on the National Register of Historic Places in Indiana
Italianate architecture in Indiana
Greek Revival architecture in Indiana
Queen Anne architecture in Indiana
Colonial Revival architecture in Indiana
Historic districts in LaPorte County, Indiana
National Register of Historic Places in LaPorte County, Indiana